Kentucky Amendment 2 is a rejected legislatively referred constitutional amendment to the Kentucky Constitution, which was voted on as part of the 2022 elections. If enacted, the amendment would have declared that nothing in the Kentucky Constitution could be construed to protect a right to an abortion or public funding of an abortion.

Kentucky was one of six states to vote on an abortion-related referendum as part of the 2022 elections, alongside California, Michigan, Montana, Kansas, and Vermont. This was in the immediate aftermath of the United States Supreme Court's decision in Dobbs v. Jackson Women's Health Organization, which held that the United States Constitution did not confer a right to an abortion, allowing individual states to permit, regulate, or prohibit abortion. In 2022, Kentucky was the only one of these states with both an active abortion ban and an active abortion referendum. Following the results of the referendum, Kentucky's abortion ban was contested by the Kentucky Supreme Court, of which as of  has yet to make a judgement on whether the Kentucky Constitution secures abortion rights and if the referendum dictates their judgement.

Background

Following the U.S. Supreme Court's decision in Dobbs, a trigger law went into effect banning any abortions in Kentucky unless necessary to prevent death or physical impairment of a pregnant woman. This ban was temporarily blocked by a court on June 30, 2022, then re-instated by a higher court on August 1, 2022.

The amendment was introduced in the Kentucky Legislature in March 2021 as HB 91. It was supported by Kentucky Right to Life and opposed by the ACLU of Kentucky.
Supporters of the amendment organized as the group Yes for Life, while opponents of the amendment organized as the group Protect Kentucky Access.

Arguments
Supporters of the "Yes" campaign claimed that the amendment was a safeguard against judicial activism and a potential state-level Roe v. Wade decision by the Kentucky Supreme Court. They argued that late-term abortion and public funding for abortion would become common in Kentucky had the amendment failed.

Supporters of the "No" campaign claimed that abortion would become permanently banned in Kentucky had the amendment succeeded, and that exceptions for rape and incest could never become law under the proposed amendment.

Results

Aftermath

The uniform results in Kentucky, Montana, California, Vermont, and Michigan abortion referendums were seen as a victory for the pro-choice movement, and were praised by pro-choice organizations and activists. Pro-life organizations such as Susan B. Anthony Pro-Life America attributed their losses to misinformation and large amounts of outside spending from the pro-choice side.

State attorney general Daniel Cameron stated that the failure of the amendment should have no impact on whether the Kentucky Constitution contains the right to an abortion.

On February 16, 2023, the Kentucky Supreme Court ruled that abortion providers lacked standing to challenge the state's abortion ban, but did not elaborate on whether or not the Kentucky Constitution secured abortion rights.

See also
Abortion in the United States
2022 Kansas Value Them Both Amendment

References

2022 ballot measures
2022 Kentucky elections
Abortion referendums
Kentucky ballot measures
United States state abortion legislation